Evesham River Festival started in 1986 and is held in Workman Gardens,  Evesham on the banks of and in the River Avon. The festival is usually arranged for mid-July. The festival consists of visiting fancy-dressed boats, often decoratively illuminated, waterways skill demonstrations/competitions and also various events and entertainments for both the boaters and visiting members of the public.  These events have included Douglas DC-3 fly by from The Battle of Britain Memorial Flight, morris men and live music.

References

Evesham
Festivals in Worcestershire